Ancylistes is a genus of beetles in the family Cerambycidae, containing the following species:

subgenus Ancylistes
 Ancylistes bellus Gahan, 1890
 Ancylistes biacutoides Breuning, 1970
 Ancylistes biacutus Breuning, 1957
 Ancylistes bicuspis (Chevrolat, 1857)
 Ancylistes bicuspoides Breuning, 1970
 Ancylistes distinctus Fairmaire, 1901
 Ancylistes gibbicollis Fairmaire, 1897
 Ancylistes impunctatus Fairmaire, 1897
 Ancylistes parabiacutoides Breuning, 1971
 Ancylistes parabiacutus Breuning, 1970
 Ancylistes subtransversus Breuning, 1957
 Ancylistes transversoides Breuning, 1970
 Ancylistes transversus Fairmaire, 1905

subgenus Lactancylistes
 Ancylistes lacteomaculatus Breuning, 1957
 Ancylistes lacteopictus Fairmaire, 1897
 Ancylistes lacteovittatus Breuning, 1957

subgenus Obscurancylistes
 Ancylistes obscuricollis (Fairmaire, 1902)

References

 
Acanthocinini